Pleyben is a commune in the Châteaulin arrondissement of Finistère department of Brittany in north-western France. The calvary in the churchyard dates from 1555.

Population
Inhabitants of Pleyben are called in French Pleybennois.

See also
Communes of the Finistère department
Parc naturel régional d'Armorique
Yann Larhantec Sculptor "Croix de cimetière" in Pleyben
Pleyben Parish close
Roland Doré sculptor Sculptor of Pleyben calvary
Calvary at Plougonven
List of the works of the Maître de Thégonnec

References

External links

Official website

Mayors of Finistère Association 

Communes of Finistère